James Hugh Thursfield FRCP (July 1869 – 20 June 1944) was a British paediatrician. With Archibald Garrod and Frederick Batten he edited Diseases of Children (1913), and he edited Archives of Diseases in Childhood (founded 1926). He served as a major at the 14th General Hospital at Boulogne during the First World War.

References

External links

1869 births
1944 deaths
19th-century English medical doctors
20th-century English medical doctors
British paediatricians
Fellows of the Royal College of Physicians
Royal Army Medical Corps officers
British Army personnel of World War I